"La Última Hora" is a song and single by Gibraltarian Flamenco Metal band Breed 77. It was first released as a CD EP in a card slip-case, and later released as a CD single and 7" Vinyl. Released on 20 November 2003, this was the first new song to be heard from Cultura. All tracks written by Breed 77. Recorded at Alberts Studio, London. The line-up for this single consisted of: Paul Isola, Danny Felice, Stuart Cavilla, Pete Chichone and Pedro Caparros.

Track listing
 "La Última Hora" (The Final Hour)
 "The Hole"
 "Oración Final" (Final Prayer)
 "Calling Out" (Demo)
 "Floods"
 "La Última Hora" (CD-ROM Video)
 "Floods" [Live] (CD-ROM Video)

Professional reviews
Get Ready To Rock link

References

Breed 77 albums
Breed 77 songs
2003 singles
2003 EPs